The 1991 Men's South American Volleyball Championship, took place in 1991 in São Paulo.

Final positions

1991 in volleyball
Men's South American Volleyball Championships
1991 in South American sport
International volleyball competitions hosted by Brazil 
1991 in Brazilian sport